The Goetic demon Astaroth, whose name is derived from Ashtoreth, the biblical spelling of the name of the Phoenician goddess Astarte, has appeared many times in modern popular culture.

Film
 Der Golem, wie er in die Welt kam (1920), this silent film depiction of the "Golem of Prague" legend shows Rabbi Judah Loew summoning the demon Astaroth to reveal the Word that will bring the clay monster to life.
 Bedknobs and Broomsticks (1971), the Star of Astoroth is a magical artifact sought by the protagonists, previously belonging to a sorcerer of the same name.
 To the Devil a Daughter (1976)
 Ghoulies (1984), one of the demons summoned throughout the film.
 Extra Ordinary (2019), Christian Winter summons Astaroth to regain his popularity.

Music
Astaroth: Book of Angels Volume 1 (by Jamie Saft Trio, 2005)
 Referenced in the song "Consumite Furore" in the PC adventure game Phantasmagoria
 Referenced in the song "At the Sound of the Demon Bell" by the heavy metal band Mercyful Fate
 Referenced in the song "Black Dwarf" by the doom metal band Candlemass
 The song "Alone in the Dark" by Testament contains a reference to Astaroth.
 A song of the Spanish heavy metal group Mägo de Oz from their album Finisterra.  Astaroth is also mentioned in several of their songs.
 Mentioned by the Swedish doom metal band Draconian in their songs "The Gothic Embrace" and "Serenade of Sorrow".
 Mentioned by Dio on the closing narration track of the 2000 concept album "Magica".
 Mentioned in the song "Come to the Sabbat" by Black Widow on their Sacrifice album.
 Referenced in the title of California-based hardcore band Catherine's debut album Rumor Has It: Astaroth has Stolen Your Eyes.
 The seal of Astaroth is printed on (some editions of) the CD Ænima by the band Tool.
 Mentioned in the song "Slaying the Prophets Ov Isa" by the Polish death metal band Behemoth.
 The band Thus Defiled has a song called "Astaroth (The Art of Balance in the Dark)" on their 2007 release Demonspawn.
 The band Anticlone has a song called "Astaroth" on their 2016 release The Root Of Man.
 17 lesser known metal (mainly black metal) bands are called Astaroth, as registered in the Encyclopedia Metallum.
 The seal of Astaroth is also present in the album artwork of Abrahadabra by Dimmu Borgir.
The seal of Astaroth appears on the cover of Bruce Dickinson's (Iron Maiden) Best of CD released in 2001.
 Mentioned in the song "Retreat Underground" by avant-garde rock band The Gabriel Construct
 Mentioned in the song "The Devils Bleeding Crown" by Danish Heavy/Rock band Volbeat
 Jyrki 69 uses Astaroths emblem on his album cover for American Vampire in 2021
 The central lyrical focus of the song "Carnal Beast" by slamming deathcore band Shrine of Malice, off their 2019 album Sheol.

Literature
 zA spirit commissioned by the Antichrist in Tim Lahaye and Jerry B. Jenkins Left Behind series
 The arch-villain of Henry H. Neff's The Tapestry series.
 A character in Luigi Pulci's Renaissance epic Morgante.
 Name of a novel written by Croatian writer Ivo Brešan.
 Astaroth is mentioned in Gordon's poem in Keep the Aspidistra Flying by George Orwell.
 Made several appearances as the demonic uncle of the titular character in the comic book Hellboy.
 The chief enemy and brother of The Demiurge in the horror role-playing game Kult.
 A demon representing Sloth, one of the Seven Deadly Sins in the manga Angel Sanctuary by Kaori Yuki.
 One of the many aliases of the Stephen King villain Randall Flagg.
 A daemon who appeared briefly in the Warhammer 40,000 comic Daemonifuge.
 Astaroth appeared in DC Comics as a Archfiend of Hell who is involved with the Gentleman Ghost's becoming a ghost in the first place.
 Astaroth appeared in the manga Ao no Exorcist as the first villain to fight Rin Okumura.
 Astaroth appears as a supporting character / villain in Marlon Pierre-Antoine's Wandering Stars.
 Astaroth is a main antagonist in the latter parts of the GS Mikami manga.
 Astharoshe Asran is a character in the Trinity Blood series.
 Astaroth is the name of Ren Kouen's dijin in Magi: The Labyrinth of Magic.
 Astaroth (Roth), Crown Prince of Hell, is a major character in the romance series The Dark Elements by Jennifer Armentrout.
 Astaroth is shown on multiple occasions in the novel God's Demon by Wayne Douglas Barlowe
 Astaroth appears as the main antagonist in issue 9-11 in Now Comics The Real Ghostbusters comic series.
 Astaroth is the name of the Gundam featured in the  Mobile Suit Gundam: Iron-Blooded Orphans Steel Moon manga series.
 It's also the name of a Gundam (as Ashtaron) in the Gundam X television series.
 Astaroth is the eponymous demon in the Webtoons manhwa, Love Advice from the Great Duke of Hell.
 Astaroth is a key figure in The Grove of Ashtaroth by John Buchan.
 Astaroth appeared in the manga Black Clover, as the third member of the devil trio ruling the underworld.
 Astaroth is the secondary antagonist of the young adult fiction Demon Road Trilogy, written by Derek Landy.

Television
 Astaroth appears in Strange as the Jewish and Christian Devil, as being the demon who rose in power until humanity worshipped him as the Devil.
 Blood Ties, the lead character has the seal of Astaroth magically tattooed on her wrists
 Astaroth appears in an episode of Friday the 13th: The Series (season 3's "The Prophecies") as a fallen angel who seeks to fulfill six prophecies in the hopes of opening the doorway for Lucifer to walk the earth.
 Astaroth appears in the first episode of Ao No Exorcist as a demon who possessed a teenager and was exorcised by the protagonist's step-father, Fujimoto Shiro
 Astaroth is the family name of Diodora Astaroth one of the antagonists in the anime High School DxD
Astaroth is a supporting character in the 2017 anime series Sin: Nanatsu no Taizai
 Astaroth's sigil appears in the background of Truman's office in the last couple episodes of Twin Peaks
Astamon is a demon Digimon based on Astaroth. In line with Astaroth being associated with Sloth, his digivolved form is Belphemon (based on Belphegor), the Demon Lord of Sloth and one of the (Seven) Great Demon Lords.
 In BBC's Apparitions, a powerful demon called Astaruth is the primary antagonist, possessing a former soldier named Michael.
 In the season 3 episode "Malleus Malleficarum" of the CW show Supernatural, Astaroth appears as a demon who takes souls in exchange for magical power.
 In the Timm Thaler (2002 TV series) he appears under the name Astarod, notably, he appears as a Monster-Purse in the animated television series.
 Astaroth is referenced several times in "The Day of the Devil" episode of Inspector Morse.

Gaming
 NeverDead, the main villain is Astaroth, who kills the main character's beloved and making him an immortal demon lord who will suffer for eternity.
 Catherine, Astaroth (voiced by Yuri Lowenthal) is revealed as the demon who orchestrates, along with Dumuzid, a curse against men who have thoughts of infidelity
 Dungeons & Dragons role-playing game, Astaroth appears as a deity for those of chaotic evil alignment
 Final Fantasy II, Astaroth is a boss fought near the end of the game. Another version of this boss is also fought in Final Fantasy IV: The After Years.
 The Demon King Astaroth is the final boss in the original Ghosts 'n Goblins video game and a boss character in Ghouls 'n Ghosts and Super Ghouls 'n Ghosts. A character similar in appearance and attack to him also appears as a mid-boss in Rosenkreuzstilette Freudenstachel.
 Grand Chase, Astaroth is the mini-boss in Mana Valley with his pet Mynos, who was behind the downfall of Xenia continent Gods
 MagnaCarta II, Astaroth is a sentinel, some kind of powerful golem from eons past used by the northern forces and that we are condemned to fight in Old Fox Canyon
 MapleStory, Astaroth is a boss at the end of Adventurer's quests
 Shinra Bansho, a more notable character depicted in one of the trading cards found in Chocolate Wafer packages in Japan is the Demon General Astaroth, a high ranking blue skinned demoness.
 Omikron: The Nomad Soul computer game, the prince of demons and enemy of Kushulai'n is named Astaroth
 Painkiller: Resurrection, Astaroth appears to the hero at the end of the second level, announcing himself as one of the generals in Lucifer's army
 Phantasmagoria, Asteroth is the main antagonist
 Sacrifice, Astaroth is a Demon Lord, summoned through the Demon Gate of Golgotha, by the God of Slaughter, to fight the demon Marduk. 
 Shadow Hearts: Covenant video game, Astaroth appears as one of the main boss enemies as well as a crest that gives the characters magical abilities.
 Shin Megami Tensei: Devil Survivor, Astaroth appears as a demon
 , appears in the card game and snack food Shinra-Bansho and is a blue-skinned female version.
 Soul Calibur series of video games, a golem named Astaroth is a playable character
 Ultima V, Astaroth is the name of the Shadowlord of Hatred
 In Daemon Bride, Astaroth is the name of a woman-like entity that serves as an assistant to Dusk, one of the playable characters. Astaroth also serves as the demon of Sloth in the franchise in place of Belphegor.
 Astarte is a demonic assistant in the game Devil's Deception Astaroth is a SR card in Valkyrie Crusade, Astaroth become a maiden in Valkyrie Crusade. She can be obtained by using Arcana Turn-over to make Aphrodite turn into Astaroth, Now are unobtainable already.
 Astaroth is a wood and dark attribute demon monster in the mobile game Puzzle & Dragons, along with her series-mates Baal, Belial, and Amon
 Ianzuma Eleven 3, the Goalkeeper of a post-game team is named Astaroth.
 Inazuma Eleven GO 2: Chrono Stone, post-game character, Asta, as well as his Keshin are both named after Astaroth.
 In Closers Online, Astaroth is a boss in Red Crystal dungeon entry, Plane Gate. G Tower Training Program. And replica dungeon. Astaroth is male, he has a long sword and (small) dragon around him (awakening)
 Astaroth appears in mobile phone game Doodle Devil as an unlockable character for a game mode named "Demon Battle". Astaroth appears in this mode alongside Baal, Chimera, Cthulhu, Kronos, Mammon, Medusa, Shub-Niggurath, and a "demon" known as Succubus
 Rocket League, Astaroth is the name of a decal for the Breakout.
 White Noise 2, Astaroth is a playable character in the sequel to the popular horror game, White Noise. Along with several other creatures in the game, he has abilities that can be used to attack the group of investigators, the creature's main objective.
 Astaroth appears as a giant creature who wants to rule the galaxy and as the main antagonist in a visual novel called Marco And The Galaxy Dragon.
 Genshin Impact, the God of Moments, Time and Thousand Winds, Istaroth. Her name is derived from Astaroth. She plays an unknown yet very important role in the lore of the game, and has been mentioned in the story of multiple regions within the game.
 Astaroth is a recurrent antagonist in the 2017 game Faith: The Unholy Trinity''. He is depicted as Gary Miller, a human-like personification of the demon.

References

Astarte
Demons in popular culture